Mehmet Azmi Turgut (born February 25, 1988) is a Turkish professional basketball player, who plays for Olin Edirne.

External links
TBLStat.net Profile

References

1988 births
Living people
Beşiktaş men's basketball players
Darüşşafaka Basketbol players
Point guards
Turkish men's basketball players